The Sailor Story 1975-1996 is a two-disc Compilation / Greatest Hits album released in 1996 by New Zealand band, Hello Sailor.

Track listing

Hello Sailor (band) albums
1996 greatest hits albums